Kraft, or Kraft Foods, is an American food processing conglomerate.

Kraft may also refer to:

Companies 
 Kraft Foods Inc, a former American manufacturing and processing conglomerate formed in 1923, renamed Mondelez International following the 2012 split
 Kraft Foods Group, the company formed in 2012 when the original Kraft Foods Inc. was split, merged with Heinz to form Kraft Heinz in 2015
 Kraft Heinz, the company the post-2012 Kraft Foods formed, after merging with Heinz in 2015
 Kraft Foods Ltd, Australian company from 1935, which began as the Kraft Walker Cheese Co., a partnership between Fred Walker and Kraft Foods Inc.
 The Kraft Group, a group of privately held companies in sports, manufacturing, and real estate development

People 
 Kraft (surname)
 Kraft Ehricke (1917–1984), German rocket scientist

Other uses 
 Kraft process, a paper pulp production method
 Kraft paper, paper produced by the Kraft process
 Kraft (Catch-22), a character in Joseph Heller's novel Catch-22
 Närpes Kraft Fotbollsförening, association football club from Närpes, Finland
 Team Kraft, Toyota semi-works Super GT team, see Ronnie Quintarelli
 Kraft (Lindberg), a musical composition created by Magnus Lindberg
 Kraft (album), an album by Vreid

See also 
 Craft (disambiguation)
 Krafft (disambiguation)
 Harry Kraf (1907–1989), New York politician and judge